Sheila Gujral was a poet, writer and social worker who was the wife of Inder Kumar Gujral, the 12th Prime Minister of India.

Personal life 
Sheila Gujral was born in 24 January 1924 in Lahore and was married to Inder Kumar Gujral on 26 May 1945. On July 11, 2011, she died at her home after a brief illness. They had two sons, Naresh Gujral (born 19 May 1948), who is a Rajya Sabha MP, and Vishal Gujral.

Awards 
She is recipient of International Poets Academy's Life Time Achievement Award and Golden Poet Award.

References 

1924 births
2011 deaths